Hepatocyte growth factor activator is a protein that in humans is encoded by the HGFAC gene.

The protein encoded by this gene, belongs to peptidase family S1. It is first synthesized as an inactive single-chain precursor before being activated to a heterodimeric form by endoproteolytic processing. It acts as serine protease that converts hepatocyte growth factor to the active form.

References

Further reading